Max Elloy (5 May 1900 – 16 January 1975) was a French film actor. He appeared in 50 films between 1942 and 1967.

Filmography

 Mademoiselle Swing (1942) - Max
 Défense d'aimer (1942) - Le voyageur affamé
 Feu Nicolas (1943) - Le croque-mort
 Patrie (1946)
 Mademoiselle s'amuse (1948)
 Une femme par jour (1949) - Freddy
 Manon (1949) - Le garçon de restaurant (uncredited)
 Return to Life (1949) - Le vieux barman (segment 2 : "Le retour d'Antoine") (uncredited)
 We Will All Go to Paris (1950) - Honorin
 The Chocolate Girl (1950)
 Le Roi Pandore (1950) - Un créancier
 Father's Dilemma (1950) - Lo spazzino
 Mon ami le cambrioleur (1950) - L'agent de police
 Atoll K (1951) - Antoine
 Nous irons à Monte Carlo (1951) - Himself
 Plaisirs de Paris (1952) - Léon
 The Sparrows of Paris (1953) - Petit Louis
 His Father's Portrait (1953) - Le chauffeur
 Mam'zelle Nitouche (1954)
 Secrets d'alcôve (1954) - Firmin (uncredited)
 Leguignon the Healer (1954) - Le facteur
 Mourez, nous ferons le reste (1954)
 Sur le banc (1954) - Un clochard
 Oasis (1955) - Natkine
 Pas de souris dans le business (1955)
 Les Nuits de Montmartre (1955)
 Maid in Paris (1956)
 Pardonnez nos offenses (1956)
 Paris, Palace Hotel (1956) - Un maître d'hôtel
 Les Lumières du soir (1956) - M. Marcel - l'agent de police
 L'Homme et l'Enfant (1956) - (uncredited)
 Mitsou ou Comment l'esprit vient aux filles (1956) - Le maître d'hôtel chez Larue
 Let's Be Daring, Madame (1957) - Le bridadier
 Mademoiselle and Her Gang (1957) - Victor
 Nous autres à Champignol (1957) - Maxime
 C'est arrivé à 36 chandelles (1957) - L' huissier
 Le désir mène les hommes (1957) - Le brigadier
 Le Souffle du désir (1958) - Alexis
 Neither Seen Nor Recognized (1958) - (uncredited)
 Mimi Pinson (1958)
 Madame et son auto (1958)
 Le Gendarme de Champignol (1959) - Le gendarme La Huchette
 Babette Goes to War (1959) - Firmin
 Certains l'aiment froide (1960) - Simpson, le majordome
 Les Tortillards (1960) - M. Bonfils (uncredited)
 Dans l'eau qui fait des bulles (1961) - Un pêcheur
 All the Gold in the World (1961) - Le garde-champêtre
 Tintin and the Golden Fleece (1961) - Nestor
 Alerte au barrage (1961)
 The Devil and the Ten Commandments (1961) - (uncredited)
 It's Not My Business (1962) - L'huissier
 Le Magot de Josefa (1963) - Un villageois
 That Man from Rio (1964) - Le médecin (uncredited)
 Tintin and the Blue Oranges (1964) - Nestor
 Trois enfants dans le désordre (1966) - L'appariteur

References

External links

1900 births
1975 deaths
French male film actors
20th-century French male actors